Beanibazar is an upazila (sub-district) of Sylhet District in northeastern Bangladesh, part of the Sylhet Division. The area is the successor of the territory of Panchakhanda, formerly ruled by the aristocratic Pal family.

History
Beanibazar was part of the Kamarupa Kingdom in ancient times along with North Bengal and Mymensingh. The Nidhanpur copperplate inscription records a 7th century land grant to 200 Brahmins near the Kushiyara River by King Bhaskaravarman.

The historic Panchakhanda pargana covered all of Beanibazar as well as surrounding areas. In the medieval period, the scarcely inhabited area of Panchakhanda was a feudal monarchy under Kalidas Pal and his descendants who assumed the title Raja. The ruins of the Pal royal palace and the large dighi (reservoir) that it sits beside were constructed by Kalidas's great-grandson, Varanasi Pal, in the 7th century BS (s CE). They can still be seen in Beanibazar today. The Pals significantly developed and cultivated Panchakhanda allowing the migration of groups such as the Mahimals (who were led by their two Sardars Raghai and Basai) into the area. Mahimals subsequently maintained a presence in the region into modern times. After the Conquest of Sylhet in 1303, Khwaja Adina Sufi - a disciple of Shah Jalal - migrated to what is now Adinabad in Charkhai (in Beanibazar) where he preached Islam to the local people. Three generations after Varanasi Pal, during the reign of Ramjivan Pal, Panchakhanda came under the suzerainty of the Sultan of Bengal. Pratapchandra Pal of this family converted to Islam and founded the Muslim branch of the Pal dynasty in the Baghprachanda Khan mouza.

The name Beanibazar is derived from the existing Bihani Bazaar ("Morning Market") which was founded by the local landowner Krishna Kishore Pal Chowdhury. On 29 December 1912, a cultivator in Nidhanpur village discovered what he thought was a clue to the location of a hidden treasure, during the process of building his buffalo shed. He took the plates to a local landholder who brought them to the attention of authorities in Silchar, thus rediscovering the Nidhanpur copperplate inscriptions.

On 18 May 1940, one of the five thanas of the Karimganj Mahakuma, Jolodhup, was planned to also be split into two – Beanibazar and Barlekha. Beanibazar was given to the Sylhet Mahakuma while Barlekha went to South Sylhet Mahakuma. The upazila was the headquarters of the Nankar Rebellion. Beanibazar became an upazila in 1983. In the 1990s, coins of a Sultan of Bengal by the name of Nasiruddin Ibrahim Shah (r. 1415/16 - 1416/17) were discovered in Beanibazar. In 2009, the Beanibazar Sporting Club and Beanibazar Cancer & General Hospital were founded.

Geography
It has a total area of 253.22 km2.

Sheola Sutarkandi International Border Crossing
Sheola-Sutarkandi International Border Crossing on Bangladesh–India border on Karimganj-Beanibazar route is in Karimganj district of the Indian state of Assam. Famous for having an International trade centre, Sutarkandi is an international border of India and Bangladesh. Through this space, export of fruits, silicon and coal is done. The place is situated in the district of Karimganj, Assam. It is located 14 km away from Karimganj and contains principal custom check post for the trade flow. Two national highway runs through Sutarkandi that is National Highway 151 (old) and National Highway 7 (new) which is 45 km from the border of Sylhet town of Bangladesh.

Demographics

According to the 2011 Bangladesh census, Beanibazar Upazila had 42,119 households and a population of 253,616, 16.6% of whom lived in urban areas. 11.3% of the population was under the age of 5. The literacy rate (age 7 and over) was 59.7%, compared to the national average of 51.8%.

Administration
Beanibazar Upazila is divided into Beanibazar Municipality and ten union parishads: Alinagar, Charkhai, Dubag, Kurarbazar, Lauta, Mathiura (sola kak), Mullapur, Muria, Sheola, and Tilpara. The union parishads are subdivided into 132 mauzas and 174 villages.

Beanibazar Municipality is subdivided into 9 wards and 37 mahallas.
 Pourashava: Dashgram, Khasharipara, Sreedhora, Nobang, Kashba, Pondit Para, Supatala, Noyagram, Fothepur, Khasha
 Alinagar: Raykhail, Rajapur, Chandgram, Nij Muhammadpur, Kadimolik, Konkalosh, Khasha, Kholagram, Uzandaki, Hatim Khani, Korgram, Dudair Paton, Chondor pur, Uttarbhag Nowagram, Beani bazar, Tikorpara, Uttar Bhag, Routh Bhag, Nosir Khani
 Charkhai: Duttagram, Agiram, Bilua, Deulgram, Bagbari, Dahal, Gulaghat, Sachan, Shafachak, Torongo, Jalalnagar, Adinabad, Mondergram, Koskot Khan
 Dubag: Kharavora, Gozukata, Goilapur, Charia, Mewa, Ejra, Panjipuri, Moyakhali, Dubag, Sylhetipara, Bangalhuda, Noya Dubag, Chokorbondo, Shutarkandi, Kunagam, Borogram
5 No. Kurar Bazar: Aaqakhazana, Govindasree, Angura Muhammadpur, Deulgram, Angura Falokuna, North Aaqakhazana (Lamligram), Lawjary, Goror Band, Khashir Band, Khashir Naam Nagar, Khashir Band Haati Tila, Arij Khan Tila, Sharak Bhangni, Angarjur, Malarghaon
 Lauta: Phariabohor, Kalibahar, Jaldhup, Baurbag, Kalaiura, Baraigram, Gultikar, Bahadurpur, Baghprachanda Khan, Tikarpara, Nandirpal, Gangpar, Gojarai, Astoshangon, Hijlor Tuk, Kanli
 Mathiura
 Mullapur: Abdullapur, Pathon, Huknia Moholla, Nidhanpur, Lama Nidhanpur, Usphara, Barigram, Chandagram, Matikata, Kashatul, Lushaitola, Sopatola
 Muria: Chhotadesh, Fengram, Bagon, Kunagram, Abhongi, Ashtogori, Borodesh, Barudha, Maijkapon, Chandagram, Noagaon, Ghungadia, Moirangon, Sharoper, Tajpur, Takaikuna, Noagram
 Sheola: Balinga, Kakordia, Teradol, Shaleswar, Ghorua, Charaboi, Daudpur
 Tilpara: Dasura, Sodorpur, Matizura, Holimpur, Gangukul, Kamarkhandi, Tuka Voraut, Shaneshor, Bibiray, Rojob, Debarai, Kangkul, Pirerchok, Dokkin Dsura

Upazila Chairmen

News papers
 Beanibazar Times
 Beanibazar News24
 The weekly Beanibazar Barta

Notable people
 Athar Ali Bengali, 20th-century politician and Islamic scholar
 Ashab Uddin, former major general and ambassador
 Khan Bahadur Dr. Moulvi Muraqib Ali Khan, British Indian Civil Service First Class Gazetted Veterinary Surgeon. 
 Tawfiq-e-Elahi Chowdhury, energy advisor to the Prime Minister of Bangladesh
 Hansen Clarke, American former congressman
 Govinda Chandra Dev, philosopher and lecturer
 Lenin Gani, sports journalist
 Helal Khan, film actor
 Iftakar Chowdhury, film director 
 Hasina Momtaz, former press officer for the Mayor of London
 Nurul Islam Nahid, former Minister of Education in Bangladesh
 Zia Uddin, president of Jamiat Ulema-e-Islam Bangladesh
 Pal family, aristocratic landowning family

See also
 Nidhanpur copperplate inscription
 Upazilas of Bangladesh

References